Abdolreza Kahani (born 22 December 1973) is an Iranian filmmaker.

He made his first short film, The Smile in 1988. He made his first feature film, Dance with the Moon in 2003.
In 2009, Kahani's film Twenty won the Special Jury Prize and the Prize of Ecumenical Jury at the Karlovy Vary International Film Festival. The film observes a small band of employees trying to save a depressed Iranian banquet hall which the owner has decided to close in 20 days.

Personal life 
Abdolreza Kahani was born on 22 December 1973 in Nishapur.

Filmography as director

Awards and honors

Awards
Special Jury Award at the ran Cinema Celebration in 2011 for the film Horses are Noble Animals
Audience Award Yerevan International Film Festival 2010 for the film Nothing
Special Prize of the Jury Karlovy Vary International Film Festival 2009 for the film Twenty
Prize of the Ecumenical Jury Karlovy Vary International Film Festival 2009 for the film Twenty
Honorary Diploma Best Director 27th Fajr International Film Festival 2009 for the film Twenty
Silver Award Damascus International Film Festival 2009 for the film Twenty
Golden Alexander Thessaloniki International Film Festival 2008 for the film Over There

Honors
Critics' choice for movie of the year by Film Magazine in 2012 for By No Reason.
Praised by Parliament for Willowdale for "promoting the arts and culture throughout the world".

See also 
Iranian cinema

References

External links

1973 births
Living people
Islamic Azad University, Central Tehran Branch alumni
Iranian film directors
Iranian screenwriters
People from Nishapur